Diman (also Romanized as Dīmān; also known as Damānī) is a village in Dursun Khvajeh Rural District, in the Central District of Nir County, Ardabil Province, Iran. At the 2006 census, its population was 390, in 104 families.

References 

Towns and villages in Nir County